15th Corps, Fifteenth Corps, or XV Corps may refer to:

XV Corps (British India)
XV Corps (German Empire), a unit of the Imperial German Army prior to and during World War I
15th Army Corps (Russian Empire), a unit in World War I 
XV Royal Bavarian Reserve Corps, a unit of the Bavarian Army and the Imperial German Army during World War I
XV Army Corps (Wehrmacht), Germany
XV Mountain Corps (Wehrmacht), Germany
XV Corps (India)
XV Corps (Ottoman Empire), a unit in World War I
XV Corps (United States), a unit in World War II
XV Corps (Union Army), a unit in the American Civil War
XV Corps (United Kingdom), a unit in World War I
15th Rifle Corps, a Soviet unit World War II
XV SS Cossack Cavalry Corps, a German unit in World War II

See also
List of military corps by number
15th Army (disambiguation)
15th Division (disambiguation)
15th Group (disambiguation)
15th Wing (disambiguation)
15th Brigade (disambiguation)
15th Regiment (disambiguation)
15 Squadron (disambiguation)